Vera Tsekhanovskaya (Russian: Вера Цехановская; born Vera Vseslavovna Shengelidze on December 25, 1902) was a Russian and Soviet animation director who died on April 25, 1977.

Career 
Between 1919 and 1922, Tsekhanovskaya worked as an architectural faculty member at Petrograd Polytechnic. Then from 1923 to 1924, she worked in the graphics department of the Leningrad Art and Industrial Technical School. She was also an illustrator at Raduga Publishing House around the same time. Finally in 1932, she became a cartoon artist in the department of military technical films of the Belgoskino film studio, which opened the doors for her to become an animator at the Leningrad film studio “Rosfilm” (later - “Lenfilm”) in 1933. During the evacuation of Samarkand, she entered the Soyuzmultfilm, where she worked as an animator and then an assistant director of cartoon films. Most of her work was done alongside her husband, Mikhail Tsekhanovsky. The married couple directed many animated films together, including The Wild Swans (1962), which was part of a dossier commemorating the centenary of the Russian Revolution.

Filmography

Art director 

 1934: Bazar (Short)
 1944: Telefon (Short)

Second unit director or assistant director 

 1948: Tsvetik-semitsvetik (Short)
 1950: Skazka o rybake i rybke (Short)
 1952: Kashtanka (Short)
 1954: The Frog Princess (Short) 
 1956: The Tale of Chapayev

Director 

 1959: Legenda o zaveshchanii mavra (Short)
 1961: Lisa, bobyor i drugie (Short)
 1962: The Wild Swans
 1966: Ivan Ivanych zabolel (Short)
 Stories from My Childhood (TV Series) (1 episode) - 1998  - The Wild Swans (1998)

Screenwriter 

 1964: Post/Mail (Short)

Production designer 

 1944: The Telephone

Animator 

 1938: Dzhyabzha (Short)

See also 
History of Russian animation 
The Tale of the Priest and of His Workman Balda 
List of animated feature films of the 1960s

References

External links 
 
 Vera Tsekhanovskaya on Animator.ru

1902 births
Soviet animation directors

Soviet women film directors

1977 deaths